Fairyland (Estonian: Muinasmaa) is a novel by Estonian author August Gailit. It was first published in 1918.

See also
Estonian literature

Estonian novels
1918 novels